Kumbino (Kömbä) is a rural locality (a selo) in Inzersky Selsoviet, Beloretsky District, Bashkortostan, Russia. The population was 49 as of 2010. There are 3 streets.

Geography 
Kumbino is located 89 km northwest of Beloretsk (the district's administrative centre) by road. Inzer is the nearest rural locality.

References 

Rural localities in Beloretsky District